Orientozeuzera quieta is a moth in the family Cossidae. It was described by Turner in 1932. It is found in Australia, where it has been recorded from Queensland and north-west Australia.

References

Natural History Museum Lepidoptera generic names catalog

Zeuzerinae
Moths described in 1932